The St. John's Church at Creagerstown Historic District is a national historic district located at Creagerstown, Frederick County, Maryland  The district encompasses four contributing buildings and one contributing site, namely:

Creagerstown School Number 2, now the parish house for St. John's Church (1880) and concrete block privy / shed (c. 1930)
St. John's Reformed Church (now vacant) (1834)
St. John's Evangelical Lutheran Church (1908)
Creagerstown Cemetery

The St. John's Church at Creagerstown Historic District was listed on the National Register of Historic Places in 2007.

References

External links
, at Maryland Historical Trust

Lutheran churches in Maryland
Churches on the National Register of Historic Places in Maryland
Gothic Revival architecture in Maryland
Religious buildings and structures completed in 1834
Churches in Frederick County, Maryland
Historic districts on the National Register of Historic Places in Maryland
National Register of Historic Places in Frederick County, Maryland